2007 ISAF Sailing World Championships was the second edition of the ISAF Sailing World Championships and was held in Cascais, Portugal on the Portuguese Riviera from 28 June to 13 July.

Venue
The venue for the 2007 ISAF Sailing World Championships was Cascais and racing was held on five race areas off Cascais.

Events and equipment
The following events were open for entries:

Summary

Medal table

Event medalists

References

External links
 Full results  from site of International Sailing Federation
 Official site
 

World championships
2007
Sport in Cascais
Sailing competitions in Portugal
International sports competitions hosted by Portugal
2007 in Portuguese sport